During the 1963–64 English football season, Ipswich Town F.C. competed in the Football League First Division. Just two years after being crowned champions of England, they finished bottom of the table and were relegated to the Second Division, setting several unwelcome club records along the way.

Season summary
After beating Burnley on the opening day of the season, Ipswich went 23 league and cup matches before registering their next win, the longest winless sequence in the club's history. A 10–1 drubbing at Fulham on Boxing Day remains Ipswich's heaviest ever defeat, though the nine-goal margin was equalled in 1995 when they lost 9–0 to Manchester United in the Premier League. They ended the campaign having shipped 121 league goals, the highest total ever conceded by Ipswich in a single season. In addition to the Fulham debacle, they lost 9–1 at Stoke City and were hit for six goals or more in a further five matches.

The season saw the departure from Portman Road of the club's regular strike partnership of Ray Crawford and Ted Phillips. Crawford signed for Wolverhampton Wanderers in September 1963 (although he would return to Ipswich for a second spell two years later) and Phillips joined Leyton Orient in March 1964. John Compton (to Bournemouth and Boscombe Athletic) and Doug Moran (to Dundee United) would also move on before the start of the following season as manager Jackie Milburn began to break up Alf Ramsey's title-winning team.

One of the season's few bright spots was the goalscoring of American-born Gerry Baker, older brother of Arsenal and England forward Joe Baker. Signed by Milburn for £25,000 from Hibernian in December 1963, Baker netted 18 times in 22 matches (including three hat-tricks) to finish the season as the club's leading scorer.

Kit
Ipswich's kit was almost identical to the one worn the previous season. Although there were no changes to the shirt, blue side panels were added to the shorts, and the socks changed from blue and white hoops to plain white with blue turnovers.

Squad
Players who made one appearance or more for Ipswich Town F.C. during the 1963-64 season

League standings

Results
Home team listed first

Division One

League Cup

FA Cup

References

Ipswich Town F.C. seasons
Ipswich Town F.C.